Shamsurrahman (born 25 November 1999) is an Afghan cricketer. He made his first-class debut for Kabul Region in the 2018 Ahmad Shah Abdali 4-day Tournament on 7 March 2018. Prior to his first-class debut, he was part of Afghanistan's squad for the 2016 Under-19 Cricket World Cup. He made his List A debut for Kabul Region in the 2018 Ghazi Amanullah Khan Regional One Day Tournament on 19 July 2018. He made his Twenty20 debut on 8 October 2019, for Speen Ghar Tigers in the 2019 Shpageeza Cricket League.

References

External links
 

1999 births
Living people
Afghan cricketers
Kabul Eagles cricketers
Place of birth missing (living people)